The 1981–82 Villanova Wildcats men's basketball team represented Villanova University during the 1981–82 NCAA Division I men's basketball season. The head coach was Rollie Massimino. The team played its home games at Villanova Field House in Villanova, Pennsylvania, and was a member of the Big East Conference.  The team won the regular season Big East title and reached the Elite Eight of the NCAA tournament before falling to eventual national champion North Carolina. Villanova finished with a 22–8 record (11–3 Big East).

Roster

Schedule and results

|-
!colspan=9 style=| Regular season

|-
!colspan=9 style=| Big East tournament

|-
!colspan=9 style=| NCAA tournament

Rankings

Awards and honors
John Pinone – Robert V. Geasey Trophy (2x)

References

Villanova
Villanova
Villanova Wildcats men's basketball seasons
1981 in sports in Pennsylvania
1982 in sports in Pennsylvania